Johnny Madero, Pier 23 (sometimes listed as Johnny Modero, Pier 23 or Johnny Madero-Pier 23) was a 30-minute radio detective drama series which was broadcast on Mutual Thursday at 8 p.m. from April 24, 1947, to September 4, 1947. It was the first nationwide program for star Jack Webb.

Plots and cast
The storylines follow the footsteps of fast-talking, wisecracking Johnny Madero (Webb), who runs a boat shop on the San Francisco waterfront, rents boats and usually drops in for a weekly chat with Father Leahy (Gale Gordon). When investigating a crime, Madero manages to solve the mystery before tough cop Warchek (William Conrad). The supporting cast sometimes included Betty Lou Gerson, Elaine Burke, Bob Holden, Herb Butterfield, Irvin Lee and Herbert Rawlinson. The program came out a year after Pat Novak, for Hire (1946) originally aired and based in the same locale, San Francisco. It lasted a year before Pat Novak, for Hire returned to radio with Jack Webb back in the lead role.

Other personnel
Harry Zimmerman provided the background music. Nat Wolff directed the scripts by Richard L. Breen, Herb Margolis and Lou Markheim. The program's announcer was Tony LaFrano.

See also
 Pat Novak, for Hire

References

 Winn, Dilys. Murder Ink: The Mystery Reader's Companion. Workman, 1977.

External links
Thrilling Detective: Johnny Modero

Program logs
Log of episodes of Johnny Modero, Pier 23 from Jerry Haendiges Vintage Radio Logs
Log of episodes of Johnny Madero, Pier 23 from The Digital Deli Too
Log of episodes of Johnny Madero, Pier 23 from RadioGOLDINdex

Streaming audio
Episodes of Johnny Madero, Pier 23 from Old Time Radio Researchers Group Library
Episodes of Johnny Madero, Pier 23 from the Internet Archive

American radio dramas
Detective radio shows
1940s American radio programs
1947 radio programme debuts
1947 radio programme endings
Mutual Broadcasting System programs